Filbornaskolan is a school located in the outskirts of Helsingborg in Sweden. The school hosts a number of programmes. Notable former alumni include Henrik Larsson.

Schools in Sweden